Fondation Chirezi (FOCHI) is a local non-governmental organisation established in the African Great Lakes Region by Floribert Kazingufu Kasirusiru (Flory Zozo). The core objective of FOCHI is to build a campaign for a non-killing society in the Great Lakes Region - eastern parts of the Democratic Republic of the Congo (DRC) which has suffered both the Second Congo War and terrible waves of genocide in both Rwanda and Burundi.

"Since the early 1990s the African Great Lakes region –  defined here as the Democratic Republic of Congo  (DRC), Burundi, Rwanda, Uganda and Tanzania – has  been convulsed by genocide, civil wars, inter-state  conflict and flawed democratic transitions.    With UN-sponsored peace processes underway in  DRC and Burundi and projects of state and societal  reconstruction apparently advancing in Rwanda and  Uganda, there are hopes that the epoch of violence  and exploitation in the African Great Lakes region is  finally drawing to an end."

FOCHI is a local non-governmental initiative and has so far conducted seminars of ministers of religion and teachers, to create awareness and shift entrenched attitudes. FOCHI, with priority concern for women and children, is building local projects. The first is Farm of Hope School for orphans and children of single parent families at Kiliba, DRC, a border crossing town on the Ruzizi River, near Bujumbura (Burundi's largest city and former capital).  FOCHI's second project is a Women's Trauma and Care Centre in Bukavu, the capital of Sud-Kivu Province in the DRC, managed by Women Against Violence. The situation of women in and around Bukavu has become perilous in the period of the Second Congo War and its aftermath.

In July 2007 three communities working under the FOCHI umbrella - Kiliba Farm of Hope School, the Bukavu Women's Trauma and Care Centre, and Nyangezi (seeking community radio for youth) formed a Self-Empowering Network (SEN) to define their approach to development and mutual help.

References

External links
Fondation Chirezi
http://www.fochi.org/
"Women of Our Congo"
Insight on Conflict "Peacebuilding organisations" Chirezi Foundation (Fondation Chirezi / FOCHI)

Community-building organizations
Education in the Democratic Republic of the Congo
Educational organisations based in the Democratic Republic of the Congo